Francesco Di Jorio or Franco Di Iorio (born 22 September 1973) is a former Swiss footballer. He played over 300 games in Swiss Super League.

Honours
FC Zürich
Swiss Cup: 2004–05
Super League/Nationalliga A: 2005–06

References

External links
 Profile at Football.ch

Swiss men's footballers
Swiss expatriate footballers
Switzerland international footballers
FC Zürich players
FC Lausanne-Sport players
U.S. Salernitana 1919 players
FC St. Gallen players
FC Luzern players
FC Sion players
Swiss Super League players
Serie B players
Expatriate footballers in Italy
Association football midfielders
1973 births
Living people